The Haas VF-17 is a Formula One car designed by the Haas F1 team and built by Italian chassis manufacturer Dallara, for use in the 2017 Formula One season. The car was driven by Romain Grosjean and former Renault driver Kevin Magnussen, who replaced Esteban Gutiérrez at the end of the  season. The car made its competitive début at the 2017 Australian Grand Prix.

At the Monaco Grand Prix, the team made a livery change in which the red coloured areas of the car were replaced with a light grey colour. This change was made to make the larger driver numbers more visible. The team also scored their first ever double points finish in their history at this weekend. The team also had another livery change starting from the Belgian Grand Prix, with a more predominantly white front wing combined with a thinner red outline.

Complete Formula One results
(key) (results in bold indicate pole position; results in italics indicate fastest lap)

References

VF-17